Ensemble Sortisatio is a quartet (viola, oboe/cor anglais, bassoon and guitar) founded by violist Matthias Sannemüller in 1992 in Leipzig, Germany. Its members are mostly soloists at the MDR Symphony Orchestra. They have specialized in contemporary classical music.

Formation 
The Ensemble Sortisatio was founded in 1992 by Matthias Sannemüller in the city of Leipzig. Sannemüller was a pupil from Dietmar Hallmann and member of the Gruppe Neue Musik Hanns Eisler.

The name comes from the Sortisatio concept and refers to the casual combination of the instruments in the ensemble. The idea came from the composer Reiner Bredemeyer.

Members of the quartet are Walter Klingner (oboe and cor anglais),  Axel Andrae (bassoon), Matthias Sannemüller (viola) and Thomas Blumenthal (guitar). They are mostly soloists at the MDR Symphony Orchestra in Leipzig.

Sortisatio is today one of the most unusual ensembles in Germany. It inspired many national and international composers to write for them. They have worked with Karl Ottomar Treibmann, Günter Neubert, Thomas Müller, Christian Münch, Thomas Buchholz, Steffen Schleiermacher, Thomas Christoph Heyde, Helmut Oehring, Gerd Domhardt and other German composers.

8 Pieces on Paul Klee 
The Swiss/Austrian Groupe Lacroix (Marianne Schroeder, John Wolf Brennan, Jean-Luc Darbellay, Christian Henking, Michael Schneider, Michael Radanovics and Alfons Karl Zwicker) and Thüring Bräm dedicated 8 Pieces on Paul Klee to the Anniversary of the Central German Broadcasting. This composers group attended a master class with the Russian musician Edison Denisov. The work after Paul Klee was first performed by the Ensemble in Germany and Switzerland. Hong Kong composer Chan Wing-wah dedicated a trio Oriental Garden on Paul Klee in Bern & Winterthur to the Ensemble Sortisatio. Chan invited them to Hong Kong in 2009.

Ensemble Sortisatio 
Sortisatios second record consists of compositions written by Michael Stöckigt, Reiner Bredemeyer, Gerd Sannemüller, Pēteris Vasks from Latvia, Thomas Böttger, Jean-Luc Darbellay from Switzerland, Helmut Bieler and Jean-Louis Petit from France.

Repertoire (Extract) 
The following works were specially composed for the Ensemble Sortisatio:

Discography

References 

German musical groups
Music in Leipzig
Contemporary classical music ensembles
Chamber music groups
Musical groups established in 1992
Musical quartets